F.C. Ashdod, an Israeli football club, has played in European football since 2005, in the UEFA Cup and the Europa Conference League.

Overall record
Accurate as of 29 July 2021

Matches

References

External links 
 UEFA Profile – Ashdod

European football